General elections were held in Ecuador on 31 May 1998, with a second round of the presidential elections on 12 July. The result was a victory for Jamil Mahuad of the Popular Democracy (DP) party, who won the run-off with 51.2% of the vote. The DP alliance also emerged as the largest party in the National Congress, winning 32 of the 120 seats.

Background
Following the 1996 general elections, President Abdalá Bucaram was removed from office by Congress nine months later on grounds of mental incapacity. Fabian Alarcon thereupon took his place as caretaker Head of State.

Contestants
The leading contestants of the six (including two women) vying for the presidency were Jamil Mahuad (DP), the mayor of Quito, and Álvaro Noboa (Ecuadorian Roldosist Party), a wealthy businessman. Campaign debates were marked by personal accusations of drug links and threatened lawsuits between the two rivals, alongside statements on substantive policy questions relating primarily to corruption and the country’s ailing economy. Problems in this latter sector (high inflation, budget deficit) had been aggravated by the sociological and infrastructural damage caused by the climatic phenomenon known as El Niño and the worldwide drop in oil prices, Ecuador’s main export earner. Mahuad advocated an intense program of private investment to achieve a 5% annual growth rate, privatizations, job creation and housing construction.

Results

President

National Congress

References

1998 in Ecuador
Elections in Ecuador
Ecuador
Ecuador
Ecuador
Election and referendum articles with incomplete results